United Nations Security Council resolution 1033, adopted unanimously on 19 December 1995, after reaffirming all previous resolutions on the Western Sahara, the Council discussed the referendum for self-determination of the people of Western Sahara and the completion of the identification process.

Receiving a report from the Secretary-General Boutros Boutros-Ghali pursuant to Resolution 1017 (1995), the Council stressed the need for progress to be made in the implementation of the Settlement Plan which had been accepted by Morocco and the Polisario Front and reiterated its commitment to holding a referendum. It was also noted that the Identification Commission could only carry out its work with the full trust of both parties in its judgement and integrity.

The Security Council welcomed the efforts of the Secretary-General in accelerating and completing the identification process, and also his consultations with both parties with the aim of resolving their differences delaying the completion of the process. A report on the consultations was requested, noting that, in the event of no agreement, the United Nations Mission for the Referendum in Western Sahara (MINURSO) could be withdrawn. Both parties were urged to co-operate with it.

See also
 History of Western Sahara
 List of United Nations Security Council Resolutions 1001 to 1100 (1995–1997)
 Sahrawi Arab Democratic Republic
 Moroccan Western Sahara Wall

References

External links
 
Text of the Resolution at undocs.org

 1033
 1033
1995 in Morocco
December 1995 events